Sex, Age & Death is the fourth solo studio album by Bob Geldof.

Track listing
All songs were written by Bob Geldof, except where noted.
 "One for Me" – 4:59
 "$6,000,000 Loser" (Geldof, Pete Briquette) – 4:23
 "Pale White Girls" – 4:58
 "The New Routine" (Geldof, Briquette) – 5:25
 "Mudslide" – 4:50
 "Mind in Pocket" (Geldof, Briquette) – 4:37
 "My Birthday Suit" – 2:58
 "Scream in Vain" – 4:59
 "Inside Your Head" (Geldof, John Turnbull) – 4:38
 "10:15" – 3:21
Great Songs of Indifference re-release
"A Summer Day [London '95]" – 2:49
 "Sighs and Whispers" – 3:10
 "Voodoo Child" – 3:57
 "Two Dogs" – 3:22
 "Harvest Moon" – 3:29
 "A Summer Night [London '95]" – 3:12
 "Pale White Girls [French Mix]" – 3:47
 "Cool Blue Easy" – 4:56
 "Pity the Poor Drifter" – 2:14

Personnel
 Bob Geldof – vocals, guitar, harmonica
 Pete Briquette – bass guitar, guitar, keyboards, programming
 Alan Dunn – keyboards, accordion, backing vocals
 John Turnbull – guitars, backing vocals
 Niall Power – drums, backing vocals
 Bob Loveday – violin, bass guitar
 Roger Taylor – drums and backing vocals on "Mind in Pocket", "Mudslide" and "Scream in Vain"; backing vocals on "One for Me"
 Joshua Macrae – engineer, drums, percussion
 Keith Prior – drums
 Dean S. Crathern – assistant engineer

Singles
 "Pale White Girls" (new mood mix) / "Pale White Girls" (new moodier mix) / "Pale White Girls" (Original album version) (14 January 2002)

References

2001 albums
Bob Geldof albums